Allen Francis Veigel (January 30, 1917 – April 8, 2012) was a Major League Baseball starting pitcher, born in Dover, Ohio, who played for the Boston Bees during the 1939 season.
 
In a one-season career, Veigel posted a 0–1 record with a 6.75 ERA in two appearances, giving up six runs (four unearned) on three hits and five walks while striking out one in 2 innings of work.

During World War II, Veigel served in the Army Air Force. After the war, he had a career in sales. He continued to be involved in sports as a high school and college basketball referee.

Veigel died in the city of his birth on April 8, 2012, aged 95.

See also
1939 Boston Bees season

References

External links

Boston Bees players
Major League Baseball pitchers
Baseball players from Ohio
People from Dover, Ohio
1917 births
2012 deaths